The 163rd Division() was created in November 1948 under the Regulation of the Redesignations of All Organizations and Units of the Army, issued by Central Military Commission on November 1, 1948,basing on the 14th Independent Division of Northeastern People's Liberation Army,  formed in September.

The division was under direct control of Northeastern Military Region. Under the flag of 163rd division it took part in the Chinese civil war. In November 1951 the division was disbanded.

As of disbandment the division was composed of:
487th Regiment;
488th Regiment;
489th Regiment.

References

Infantry divisions of the People's Liberation Army
Military units and formations established in 1948
Military units and formations disestablished in 1951